South of the Rio Grande is a 1945 American western film. Released on September 15, it was the third of three Cisco Kid films made that year with Duncan Renaldo as Cisco and Martin Garralaga as Pancho.

Unusual as a Cisco Kid film, this one is a quasi-musical and opens with Cisco serenading a girlfriend. The Guadalajara Trio are featured as themselves. In this release, Cisco's real name is Juan Francisco Hernandez. Bandits Cisco and Pancho travel to a Mexican town to battle corrupt official Miguel Sanchez (Lewis) whose girlfriend Pepita (Armida) sings at a cantina. Dolores Gonzales (Molleri) is abducted and forced to sing in the cantina. When Cisco and Pancho go undercover at the Sanchez hacienda, Sanchez is eventually killed by Cisco and the town is rid of the corruption.

The film was preceded by the April 3 release of The Cisco Kid Returns, which revealed Cisco's name to be Juan Francisco Hernandez, and  In Old New Mexico on May 15, with Cisco's name changed to 
Juan Carlos Francisco Antonio.

Cast
Duncan Renaldo – The Cisco Kid/Juan Francisco Hernandez
Martin Garralaga – Pancho
George J. Lewis – Miguel Sanchez
Lillian Molieri – Dolores Gonzales
The Guadalajara Trio
Armida – Pepita

References

External links
 
 
 
 

1945 films
1945 Western (genre) films
American black-and-white films
Cisco Kid
Films produced by Lindsley Parsons
Films based on works by Johnston McCulley
Films directed by Lambert Hillyer
1940s English-language films